Thicker than Water is a soundtrack to Richard Cummings Jr.'s 1999 film Thicker than Water. It was released on October 5, 1999 via Priority Records and consisted of two discs of hip hop music. The soundtrack peaked at number 64 on the Billboard 200 albums chart and number 8 on the Top R&B/Hip-Hop Albums chart. "Let It Reign" by the Westside Connection was released as a single.

Track listing

Personnel
Damon Garrett Riddick – synthesizer (track 1), keyboards (track 21)
Barbara Wilson – backing vocals (track 19)
Kevin Gilliam – mixing (track 1)
James Hoover – mixing (track 6)
Mark Jordan – mixing (track 8)
Joe Quinde – mixing (track 22)
Brian Gardner – mastering
Eddy Schreyer – mastering (track 4)
Dedrick D'Mon Rolison – executive producer
Art Shoji – art direction
Michael Miller – photography

Charts

References

External links

1999 soundtrack albums
Drama film soundtracks
Albums produced by Nottz
Albums produced by Saukrates
Albums produced by Quincy Jones III
Albums produced by Battlecat (producer)
Priority Records soundtracks
Gangsta rap soundtracks
West Coast hip hop soundtracks